Kremlin is an unincorporated community located in the town of Pembine, Marinette County, Wisconsin, United States.

Geography

It is connected by road to Pembine to the west and by rail to Faithorn, Michigan to the east. The Menominee River flows to the east, past Nose Peak Island and the Pemebonwon Islands. Kimlark Lake (elevation ) lies immediately to the north of Kremlin, and Long Lake (elevation ) to the west.

Name
Kremlin was named after the Moscow Kremlin in 1886 by English financiers of the railroad through the settlement, possibly because relatives of the financiers were married to Russian nobility.

History
There was formerly a post office in Kremlin. On January 2, 1909, the last known cougar sighting in Wisconsin occurred at Kremlin until the species reappeared in the state in 2009.  In 1939, the company Flintkote Roofing established a plant in Kremlin to produce crushed stone for roofing, operated by the Staso Milling Company. The plant was then owned by the Central Commercial Company and then the Ruberoid Company, which merged to create GAF Materials Corporation in 1967. A reforestation program was started in Kremlin in 1946, involving the planting of 550,000 white pine, red pine, and jack pine. In 1982 a natural gas pipeline was built to the area to power the mining operations; the gas was supplied from a Michigan Consolidated Gas substation south of Vulcan, Michigan, and the pipeline runs under the Menominee River and Sturgeon River.

Industry
Kremlin is currently the location of a Specialty Granules Incorporated (SGI) plant, where there is an open-pit quarry for meta-andesite rock. The rock is crushed and processed into semi-ceramic coated colored roofing granules at the site.

References

External links

Unincorporated communities in Marinette County, Wisconsin
Unincorporated communities in Wisconsin